Merced Theatre may refer to:
Merced Theatre (Los Angeles, California)
Merced Theatre (Merced, California)